

Season 
Inter made their debut in the European Cup, due to the Scudetto won last year. Their first match was in Everton, resulting in a goalless draw. Jair, in the retour match, became the first scorer of the club in this competition. In the following rounds, Inter beat in order: Monaco (4–1 aggregate), Partizan Beograd (4–1) and Borussia Dortmund (4–2).

In the final, Inter faced off with Real Madrid who had defeated Milan (qualified as the reigning champion) in the quarter-finals. Some key men of the Spanish side, like Puskás and Di Stéfano, were about to turn 40 years old but had still wishes to win. Near the end of the first half, Sandro Mazzola scored with a shot from 25 metres. During the second half, Milani scored the goal to go up by two after Vicente's mistake. Felo marked the only point for Real Madrid, before Mazzola signed the final 3–1. Inter won the trophy in its first attempt, conquering – at the same time – its first European honour. Four days later, Inter ended the domestic league equal with Bologna at 54 points. It led, for the only time in Serie A history, to a tie-break for the awarding of Italian title: Bologna won 2–0, qualifying for 1964–65 European Cup in which Inter was admitted as defending champion.

Squad 

Squad at the end of the season

Transfers

Competitions

Serie A

League table

Results by round

Matches

Title play-off

Coppa Italia

European Cup

Round of 32

Round of 16

Quarterfinals

Semifinals

Final

Statistics

Players statistics

See also 
 History of Grande Inter

References 

Inter Milan seasons
UEFA Champions League-winning seasons
Inter